Nutaarmiut (old spelling: Nutârmiut) is an island settlement in Avannaata municipality, in northwestern Greenland. It had 43 inhabitants in 2020.

Upernavik Archipelago 

Nutaarmiut is located within Upernavik Archipelago, a vast archipelago of islands on the coast of northeastern Baffin Bay. Nutaarmiut Island has an area of 1.51 km2.

Population 
The population of Nutaarmiut has decreased by over a 40 percent relative to the 1990 levels, and has been steadily decreasing in the 2000s.

References 

Populated places in Greenland
Populated places of Arctic Greenland
Tasiusaq Bay
Upernavik Archipelago